Berenjbon (also known as Berūnjavīn and Beranjabīn) is a village in Kuhsarat Rural District, in the Central District of Minudasht County, Golestan Province, Iran. At the 2006 census, its population was 816, in 184 families.

References 

Populated places in Minudasht County